José Bravo Domínguez (18 November 1916 – 1 February 1993) was a Spanish footballer born in Ceuta, 18 November 1916.

Career
He played as a left winger, the first team he played for was SD Unión África Ceutí. He then played for Levante, SD Ceuta again, Real Murcia, Real Zaragoza and then back to Murcia. In 1940 he joined FC Barcelona in which he played until the 1947–48 season, a total of 196 games, scoring 88 goals in all competitions. With the Blaugrana he won La Liga in 1945 and 1948, in addition to the Copa del Rey in 1942. When he left the club he moved to Gimnàstic de Tarragona and thereafter SD Ceuta, where he retired in 1951.

He played one match for the Spain national team against France in Seville on 15 March 1942. Spain won by four to zero. However this was the only time he would represent La furia roja.

References 
General
60 years of national championship. (Universe Publishing, 1988).

Specific

External links

1916 births
1993 deaths
People from Ceuta
Spanish footballers
Association football wingers
Footballers from Ceuta
La Liga players
Segunda División players
Levante UD footballers
Real Murcia players
Real Zaragoza players
FC Barcelona players
Gimnàstic de Tarragona footballers
Spain international footballers
Catalonia international guest footballers